The Basque Auxiliary Navy was a section of the Spanish Republican Navy operating in the Bay of Biscay between 1936 and 1937. The naval force began their operations in October 1936 at the behest of the autonomous Basque Government. The main Basque Navy base was at Portugalete.

History

During the Spanish Civil War, the Second Spanish Republic had allowed an autonomous government in those Basque areas of Spain that had not been taken by the Nationalist faction, like Biscay and parts of Gipuzkoa.

The coast of Galicia, along with the Ferrol naval headquarters, became part of rebel-held territory early in the Spanish Civil War. When the Republican Navy became mainly confined to the Mediterranean Sea, after the failure of the blockade of the Gibraltar Strait, its operations in the Bay of Biscay were taken over by the Basque Auxiliary Navy.

Basque Auxiliary Navy ships engaged mainly in minesweeping operations. They also played a key role in the evacuation of civilians who fled as the rebel armies advanced from coastal cities such as Gijón and Santander.

The first naval action against Francoist forces took place on 15 November 1936, when the rebel destroyer Velasco attempted to intercept the armed trawlers Gipuzkoa and  Bizcaia (still under their peacetime names of Mistral and Euzkal-Erría). The trawlers were steaming for Biarritz, France, to escort a freighter when they were spotted by the warship 40 miles off Pasaia. In the ensuing battle, the Velasco was hit and limped away, while the Gipuzkoa received some damage on her forecastle, with two seamen wounded.

There was another encounter with the Velasco on 8 January 1937, when the rebel destroyer was laying down mines along with the auxiliary minelayer Genoveva Fierro off Portugalete. After a brief exchange of fire, the Nationalist warships withdrew without accomplishing their mission. The Francoist navy, however, didn't give up and nine days later they set up a minefield successfully. On 17 January the Basque armed trawler Goizeko Izarra struck one of the mines and sank with all her crew of 17 aboard. The following day, while clearing the minefield, the minesweeper Mari-Toya hit another mine and also sank; six men of her crew were lost. Two days later, after the intense work of other minesweepers, the area was declared safe. In February and April, the Nationalist navy laid down two new minefields off Bilbao, but the Basque navy neutralized the devices. The minesweepers disabled more than 200 naval mines during the campaign.

The Basque auxiliary navy became a player in a series of conflicts between the Spanish Republic and Nazi Germany, when in December 1936 the German freighters Pluto and Palos were captured by the armed trawler Bizcaia. Pluto was released, but the Palos, which was carrying military supplies to the rebels, was taken to Bilbao, where her cargo was confiscated.

The largest engagement involving the Basque navy was the Battle of Cape Machichaco, on 5 March 1937, when four naval trawlers escorting the transport ship Galdames. The armed trawlers Bizcaia, Gipuzkoa, Donostia and Nabarra tried to lure the rebel heavy cruiser  to a point within firing range of the coastal batteries. The operation was unsuccessful, ending with the sinking of Nabarra, the Gipuzkoa with her bridge shot way, and the other two trawlers scattered. The transport was eventually captured by Canarias. Gipuzkoa finally arrived at Portugalete in flames and Bizcaia headed for Bermeo, where she met the Estonian merchantman Yorbrook, previously captured by the Canarias, and forced her to make port. Donostia sought shelter in France.

On 1 May 1937, Donostia, Bizcaia and Gipuzkoa shelled the port of Bermeo, which had fallen to Italian Fascist troops the day before.

The Basque Auxiliary Navy was still operational after the fall of Bilbao in June 1937, moving away from Basque waters and setting its base in Santoña and Santander. Later, as the republic also lost those harbors, it operated off Asturias, the last Republican province in North-West Spain. Finally, following the occupation of Asturias by the Francoist armies in October 1937, the Basque Auxiliary Navy ceased its operations. Some Basque sailors became prisoners, but most of them were able to reach France.

Naval units of the Basque Auxiliary Navy

Naval trawlers
The naval trawlers were usually cod fishing vessels, known in Spanish as bous, fitted with pieces of artillery. The Donostia was the former Nationalist unit Virgen del Carmen, which changed sides after being captured and diverted to Bilbao by some members of her own crew on 6 December 1936.
 Displacement: 1,190 tnArmament: 1 x 101.2mm Vickers, 2 x 8mm SchwarzloseComplement: 50
 Displacement: 1,190 tnArmament: 2 x 101.2mm Vickers, 2 x 8mm SchwarzloseComplement: 50
 Displacement: 287 tnArmament: 1 x 76.2mm Vickers, 1 x 47mm, 2 x 8mm SchwarzloseComplement: 30
 Displacement: 1,251 tnArmament: 2 x 101.2mm Vickers, 2 x 8mm SchwarzloseComplement: 50
 Displacement: 136 tnArmament: 1 x 57mmComplement: 18
 Displacement: 136 tnArmament: 1 x 57mm, 1 x 8mm SchwarzloseComplement: 18
 Displacement: 1,204 tnArmament: 2 x 101.2mm Vickers, 2 x 8mmComplement: 50

Destroyers

Minesweepers

Motorboats

Auxiliary vessels

Yachts

See also
Spanish Republican Navy
Battle of Cape Machichaco
List of foreign ships wrecked or lost in the Spanish Civil War

References

External links
Localizan un barco que puede ser el bou 'Nabarra', hundido durante la Guerra Civil 

Spanish Republican Navy
Military units and formations of the Spanish Civil War
Basque history
1936 establishments in Spain
1937 disestablishments in Spain
Military units and formations established in 1936
Military units and formations disestablished in 1937
Atlantic naval operations of the Spanish Civil War